Final Victory (Chinese: 最後勝利) is a 1987 Hong Kong action film directed by Patrick Tam and starring Eric Tsang, Loletta Lee, Margaret Lee and Tsui Hark.

Plot
Triad leader Big Bo (Tsui Hark) is a violent man, but his younger brother Hung (Eric Tsang) is a nice guy with a light personality who fusses around him. Even once when Hung's girlfriend was taken, his brother stood up for him.

Bo committed a crime and was sentenced to prison for six months. Before he went to prison, Bo entrusted Hung to take care of his two lovers Ping (Margaret Lee) and Mimi (Loletta Lee). Hung becomes involved in a dispute between Ping and loan sharks. Later Hung and Ping also rushes to Japan and look for Mimi, who is also in a sticky situation herself. Hung beats his brain out to help them get out of trouble, while also preventing them from finding out each other's identity. After the three return to Hong Kong, Ping and Mimi discovers each other's identity as Bo's mistress. Ping cries but was restrained by Bo. While waiting for Bo's release, Hung and Mimi fall in love, but because of this, he cannot face his brother, which becomes a burden that he cannot resolve.

Cast
Eric Tsang as Hung
Loletta Lee as Mimi
Margaret Lee as Ping
Tsui Hark as Big Bo
Kam Lui as Big Bo's friend at karaoke lounge
Dennis Chan as Manager of mahjong den
Michelle Sze-ma as Hung's girlfriend
Patrick Gamble as Filipino lover of Hung's girlfriend
Johnny Koo as Man watching porn videos in Japan
Wong Hung as Loanshark Choi
Wong Ying-hung
Wong Wai-kwong
Cheung Kwok-ban
Yung Chung-yan
Cheung Yuen-ling
Wong Sin-tung
Chan Ging as Thug at Bar

Box office
The film grossed HK$5,795,427 at the Hong Kong box office during its theatrical run from 12 to 25 March 1987 in Hong Kong.

Awards and nominations

References

External links

Final Victory at Hong Kong Cinemagic

1987 films
1987 action films
1987 romantic drama films
1980s action drama films
1980s spy films
1980s spy action films
1980s Cantonese-language films
Hong Kong action drama films
Hong Kong romantic drama films
Films set in Hong Kong
Films set in Japan
Films shot in Hong Kong
Films shot in Japan
Films directed by Patrick Tam (film director)
Gun fu films
Japan in non-Japanese culture
Triad films
1980s Hong Kong films